Sodium ferrocyanide is the sodium salt of the coordination compound of formula [Fe(CN)6]4−. In its hydrous form, Na4Fe(CN)6 (sodium ferrocyanide decahydrate), it is sometimes known as yellow prussiate of soda. It is a yellow crystalline solid that is soluble in water and insoluble in alcohol. The yellow color is the color of ferrocyanide anion. Despite the presence of the cyanide ligands, sodium ferrocyanide has low toxicity (acceptable daily intake 0–0.025 mg/kg  body weight). The ferrocyanides are less toxic than many salts of cyanide, because they tend not to release free cyanide. However, like all ferrocyanide salt solutions, addition of an acid or exposure to UV light can result in the production of hydrogen cyanide gas, which is extremely toxic.

Uses
When combined with an Fe(III) salt, it converts to a deep blue pigment called Prussian blue, Fe[Fe(CN)]. It is used as a stabilizer for the coating on welding rods. In the petroleum industry, it is used for removal of mercaptans.

In the EU, ferrocyanides (E 535–538) were, as of 2018, solely authorized as additives in salt and salt substitutes, where they serve as anticaking agents. The kidneys are the organ susceptible to ferrocyanide toxicity, but according to the EFSA, ferrocyanides are of no safety concern at the levels at which they are used.

Production
Sodium ferrocyanide is produced industrially from hydrogen cyanide,  ferrous chloride, and calcium hydroxide, the combination of which affords Ca2[Fe(CN)6].  A solution of this salt is then treated with sodium salts to precipitate the mixed calcium-sodium salt CaNa2[Fe(CN)6]2, which in turn is treated with sodium carbonate to give the tetrasodium salt.

References

Sodium compounds
Cyano complexes
E-number additives
Nephrotoxins